Sankt Johann in Tirol Heliport  is a public use heliport located in Sankt Johann in Tirol, Tirol, Austria.

See also
List of airports in Austria

References

External links 
 Airport record for Sankt Johann in Tirol Heliport at Landings.com

Airports in Austria
Buildings and structures in Tyrol (state)
Transport in Tyrol (state)